Laphriinae is a subfamily of robber flies in the family Asilidae. There are more than 110 genera and 1,000 described species in Laphriinae. Larvae of the genus Hyperechia are known to grow inside the cells of Xylocopa bees, feeding on their larvae.

Laphriinae genera
Genera in the subfamily include:

Acrochordomerus Hermann, 1920
Adelodus Hermann, 1912
Afromelittodes Oldroyd and Bruggen, 1963
Afromosia Londt, 2015
Amathomyia Hermann, 1912
Andrenosoma Rondani, 1856
Anoplothyrea Meijere, 1914
Anypodetus Hermann, 1908
Aphestia Schiner, 1866
Aphistina Oldroyd, 1972
Aphractia Artigas and Papavero and Serra, 1991
Apoxyria Schiner, 1866
Atomosia Macquart, 1838
Atoniomyia Hermann, 1912
Atractia Macquart, 1838
Bathropsis Hermann, 1912
Borapisma Hull, 1957
Bromotheres Hull, 1962
Cenochromyia Hermann, 1912
Cerotainia Schiner, 1868
Cerotainiops Curran, 1930
Choerades Walker, 1851
Chrysotriclis Artigas and Papavero and Costa, 1995
Chymedax Hull, 1958
Clariola Kertész, 1901
Cochleariocera Artigas and Papavero and Costa, 1995
Cormansis Walker, 1851
Cryptomerinx Enderlein, 1914
Ctenota Loew, 1873
Cyanonedys Hermann, 1912
Cymbipyga Artigas and Papavero and Costa, 1995
Cyphomyiactia Artigas and Papavero and Serra, 1991
Dasylechia Williston, 1907
Dasyllina Bromley, 1935
Dasyllis Loew, 1851
Dasythrix Loew, 1851
Despotiscus Bezzi, 1928
Dichaetothyrea Meijere, 1914
Dissmeryngodes Hermann, 1912
Epaphroditus Hermann, 1912
Ericomyia Londt, 2015
Eumecosoma Schiner, 1866
Gerrolasius Hermann, 1920
Glyphotriclis Hermann, 1920
Goneccalypsis Hermann, 1912
Gymnotriclis Artigas and Papavero and Costa, 1995
Helolaphyctis Hermann, 1920
Hexameritia Speiser, 1920
Hodites Hull, 1962
Hoplistomerus Macquart, 1838
Hoplotriclis Hermann, 1920
Hybozelodes Hermann, 1912
Hyperechia Schiner, 1866
Ichneumolaphria Carrera, 1951
Joartigasia Martinez and Martinez, 1974
Katharma Oldroyd, 1959
Katharmacercus Tomasovic, 2014
Laloides Oldroyd, 1972
Lampria Macquart, 1838
Lamprozona Loew, 1851
Lamyra Loew, 1851
Laphria Meigen, 1803 (bee-like robber flies)
Laphygmolestes Hull, 1962
Laphyctis Loew, 1858
Laphystia Loew, 1847
Laphystotes Oldroyd, 1974
Laxenecera Macquart, 1838
Loewinella Hermann, 1912
Lycosimyia Hull, 1958
Macahyba Carrera, 1947
Mactea Richter and Mamaev, 1976
Maira Schiner, 1866
Martinomyia Özdikmen, 2006
Nannolaphria Londt, 1977
Neophoneus Williston, 1889
Notiolaphria Londt, 1977
Nusa Walker, 1851
Nyximyia Hull, 1962
Oidardis Hermann, 1912
Opeatocerus Hermann, 1912
Opocapsis Hull, 1962
Orthogonis Hermann, 1914
Pagidolaphria Hermann, 1914
Perasis Hermann, 1906
Phellopteron Hull, 1962
Pilica Curran, 1931
Pilophoneus Londt, 1988
Pogonosoma Rondani, 1856
Proagonistes Loew, 1858
Protometer Artigas and Papavero and Costa, 1995
Prytanomyia Özdikmen, 2006
Pseudonusa Joseph and Parui, 1989
Psilocurus Loew, 1874
Rhatimomyia Lynch Arribálzaga, 1882
Rhopalogaster Macquart, 1834
Scytomedes Röder, 1882
Smeryngolaphria Hermann, 1912
Stiphrolamyra Engel, 1928
Storthyngomerus Hermann, 1919
Strombocodia Hermann, 1912
Systropalpus Hull, 1962
Torebroma Hull, 1957
Tricella Daniels, 1975
Trichardis Hermann, 1906
Trichardopsis Oldroyd, 1958
Triclioscelis Roeder, 1900
Triclis Loew, 1851
Udenopogon Becker in Becker and Stein, 1913
Zabrops Hull, 1957
†Protoloewinella Schumann, 1984

References

Further reading

External links

 

 
Brachycera subfamilies